The canton of Wintzenheim is an administrative division of the Haut-Rhin department, northeastern France. Its borders were modified at the French canton reorganisation which came into effect in March 2015. Its seat is in Wintzenheim.

It consists of the following communes:

Breitenbach-Haut-Rhin
Eguisheim
Eschbach-au-Val
Griesbach-au-Val
Gueberschwihr
Gundolsheim
Gunsbach
Hattstatt
Herrlisheim-près-Colmar
Hohrod
Husseren-les-Châteaux
Luttenbach-près-Munster
Metzeral
Mittlach
Muhlbach-sur-Munster
Munster
Niedermorschwihr
Obermorschwihr
Osenbach
Pfaffenheim
Rouffach
Sondernach
Soultzbach-les-Bains
Soultzeren
Soultzmatt
Stosswihr
Turckheim
Vœgtlinshoffen
Walbach
Wasserbourg
Westhalten
Wettolsheim
Wihr-au-Val
Wintzenheim
Zimmerbach

References

Cantons of Haut-Rhin